Tom Allison may refer to:
 Tom Allison (Australian footballer) (born 1944), Australian rules footballer
 Tom Allison (English footballer) (1921–2010), English footballer
 Tom Allison (baseball) (born 1967), American baseball player and executive